Joseph Brousseau (1733–1797) was an architect active in Limousin, France, in the 18th century. His work includes Château de Faye, Limoges, Lycée Gay-Lussac, the bishops Palace in Limousin, Chapel of the Visitation, various castles in the vicinity of Limoges, and the Episcopal Palace of the Sée in Normandy.

Early life
Born in Solignac in Haute-Vienne to 1733 He was the fourth of ten children, to Jean Brousseau, a Carpenter, and Catherine Boudet. He was baptised in the parish of Sainte-Félicité de Limoges, near Pont Saint-Martial on 17 September.

Brousseau grew up in Limoges. He learned "on the job" building trades, into hollow where it stone-cutter and fitter. He then begins to draw plans himself and learned the trade of a master architect. He was then, from the 1760s, assign different achievements and became known in the region.

His first project as architect was the castle of Sainte-Feyre, it was built on the foundations of the ancient fortress between 1758 and 1762.

He died at Sées on February 5, 1797.

Corpus of work
He completed numerous projects  including:
Château de Sainte – Feyre, on the bases of the feudal Castle near Guéret (Creuse), 1760
Château de Salvanet
Castle of the husk, Veyrac, 1763
Château de Beauvais, Limoges, 1765
Palace of the bishopric, Limoges, 1766
Musée de l'Evêché
New facade of the college of Limoges (now Lycée Gay-Lussac), 1767
Chapel of the Visitation, Limoges, 1771
Rigoulene hotel, Saint-Léonard-de-Noblat, 1772
The Boucher House, at the corner of streets golden Jug and the Consulate, Limoges, 1772
Renovation and development of the general hospital of Limoges, Limoges, 1773
Reconstruction of the church Notre-Dame, 
Argentre-du-plessis, 1775
Renovation of the Church Saint-Sylvain, Ahun, 1775
Château de Salvanet, Saint-Priest-Taurion, 1776
Palace of the bishopric, Sées, 1778
Convent of Providence, Limoges, 1779
Renovation and development of the Cathedral Notre-Dame de Sées, Sées, 1780
Château de Faye, Flavignac, 1782
Convent of Augustins, Mortemart, 1785
Château de Lavergne, Saint-Priest-Ligoure, 1785
Redevelopment of the choir of the Cathedral of Saint-Étienne de Limoges, Limoges, 1788
Château de Guéret, current Museum of the Sénatorerie

Gallery

References

1733 births
1797 deaths
18th-century French architects
French neoclassical architects